In finance, a growth stock is a stock of a company that generates substantial and sustainable positive cash flow and whose revenues and earnings are expected to increase at a faster rate than the average company within the same industry. A growth company typically has some sort of competitive advantage (a new product, a breakthrough patent, overseas expansion) that allows it to fend off competitors. Growth stocks usually pay smaller dividends, as the companies typically reinvest most retained earnings in capital-intensive projects.

Criteria
Analysts compute return on equity (ROE) by dividing a company's net income into average common equity. To be classified as a growth stock, analysts generally expect companies to achieve a 15 percent or higher return on equity. CAN SLIM is a method which identifies growth stocks and was created by William O'Neil a stock broker and publisher of Investor's Business Daily.

In academic finance, the Fama–French three-factor model relies on book-to-market ratios (B/M ratios) to identify growth vs. value stocks.

Some advisors suggest investing half the portfolio using the value approach and other half using the growth approach.

See also
Alternate stock categorizations:
 Turnaround stock
 Value stock
 Treatment of growth:

Earnings growth 
PEG ratio
PVGO

Benjamin Graham formula

References

External links
 How to Find the Ultimate Growth Stock

Fundamental analysis
Stock market